Ismet is a Turkish form of the Arabic name Ismat. Along with Turkish, the name is also seen in Albanian, Bosnian, and Macedonian. The name means "honesty" or "purity" and in classical "infallibility", "immaculate", "impeccability" and "faultlessness".

Given name
 Ali İsmet Öztürk (born 1964), Turkish aerobatics pilot
 Ismet Akpinar (born 1995), German basketball player
 İsmet Atlı (1931–2014), Turkish Olympic medalist sports wrestler
 İsmet İnönü (1884–1973), second President of Turkey
 Ismet Jashari (died 1998), Albanian member of the Kosovo Liberation Army
 İsmet Kür (1916–2013), Turkish female educator, journalist, columnist and writer of mainly children's literature
 İsmet Miroğlu (1944–1997), Turkish academic
 İsmet Özel (born 1944), Turkish poet and scholar
 Ismet Horo (born 1959), Bosnian comedian
 Ismet Štilić (born 1960), former Bosnian footballer
 Ismet Alajbegović Šerbo (1925–1987),  Bosnian accordionist

See also
 Ismat

Turkish masculine given names